Little Joe the Wrangler is a classic American cowboy song, written by N. Howard "Jack" Thorp. It appeared in Thorp's 1908 Songs of the Cowboys, which was the first published collection of cowboy songs. Members of the Western Writers of America chose it as one of the Top 100 Western songs of all time.

The song is about a solitary orphan who is taken in by a group of cowboys and put to work at a man's job. Little Joe's life ends tragically when his horse suffers a fall during a stampede, crushing the young fellow beneath him. The song has been sung over and over in cow camps for over a century, and has been recorded by many Western singers.

References

1908 songs
Songs about occupations
Songs about children
Songs about death